Mary Elizabeth Turner Salter (15 March 1856 – 12 September 1938) was an American soprano and composer. She was born in Peoria, Illinois, the daughter of Jonathan and Mary E. Hinds Turner. Turner graduated from Burlington High School in Burlington, Iowa, and the Boston College of Music, and then worked as a voice teacher at Wellesley College and performed in churches. In 1881 she married Sumner Salter. She died in Orangeburg, New York. She was one of the founding members of the American Society of Women Composers.

Works
Turner wrote about 130 songs. Selected works include:

The Cry of Rachel
Song of April
A Der Schmetterling (from Three German Songs) (Text: Heinrich Heine)
Love's Epitome (a cycle of five songs)
Foreign Lands (text: Robert Louis Stevenson)
Life (from Five Songs) (Text: Paul Laurence Dunbar)
The High Song (text: Humbert Wolfe)
Wandrers Nachtlied (text: Johann Wolfgang von Goethe)

References

External links
 

1856 births
1938 deaths
19th-century classical composers
20th-century classical composers
American women classical composers
American classical composers
People from Burlington, Iowa
Wellesley College faculty
19th-century American composers
20th-century American women musicians
20th-century American composers
20th-century women composers
19th-century women composers
American women academics
19th-century American women musicians